Patrice Benausse is a French rugby league footballer who represented France national rugby league team at the 2000 World Cup.

His father, Gilbert, and uncle, René, both also represented France.

Playing career
Benausse played for the AS Carcassonne club. He made his debut for France in 1997 and later was part of the 2000 World Cup and 2001 tour of New Zealand and Papua New Guinea.

References

1972 births
Living people
AS Carcassonne players
France national rugby league team players
French rugby league players
Place of birth missing (living people)
Rugby league wingers